Q & A was published in 2005 and is the first novel of Indian diplomat Vikas Swarup. It tells the rags to riches story of Ram Mohammad Thomas, a young waiter who becomes the biggest quiz show winner in history, only to be arrested and jailed on accusations that he cheated. His lawyer is the only thing standing between him and the producers' and police' attempt to force a false confession that would deprive him of the prize. The only way to prove his innocence is by sharing the episodes of his life and travels in India which explain where and how he learned the answers to the quiz show questions.

The book was loosely adapted into the multiple Oscar-winning 2008 film Slumdog Millionaire, which features a new main character named Jamal and his brother Salim.

Inspirations
The idea for the story came from a report in a local newspaper, about children living in the Indian slums using mobile phones and the internet. At around the same time, Charles Ingram, a British army major, was found guilty of cheating in the British version of the television show Who Wants to Be a Millionaire? To quote Swarup: “If a British army major can be accused of cheating, then an ignorant tiffin boy from the world's biggest slum can definitely be accused of cheating.”

Reception 
Q & A won the South Africa's Boeke Prize 2006. It was also nominated for the Best First Book by the Commonwealth Writers' Prize and won the Prix Grand Public at the 2007 Paris Book Fair.

To date, the book has sold translation rights in 43 languages, including Arabic, French, German, Italian, Dutch, Danish, Spanish,  Greek, Romanian, Finnish, Slovenian, Croatian, Turkish, Icelandic, Chinese, Polish, Russian (Question — Answer), Norwegian, Swedish, Bulgarian, Serbian, Hindi, Gujarati (as Jackpot), Marathi, Punjabi, Tamil, Sinhala, Indonesian, Thai, Vietnamese, Japanese and Hebrew (both as The Riddle Boy from Mumbai), and Portuguese.

Novel characters

Ram Mohammad Thomas: The main character, who tells his life story to the lawyer who came to the police station and wanted to help him. He is in love with Nita and believes firmly in destiny. He possesses a "lucky" coin that he uses when confronted with big decisions—but both sides are "heads". Generally, he has a very pessimistic  and realistic view of life. His name stands for three religions because it is unknown which religion his parents had. He is an orphan like Salim.

Salim Ilyasi: Ram's best friend, who has dreams of becoming a Bollywood movie star. When he was younger, a fortuneteller predicted that he would be more famous than his Bollywood idol, which spurred on his dreams. He is two years younger than Ram and very handsome with a clear, musical voice. He also believes firmly in destiny. To sum up, his character is coined as young and childish, compared to Ram Mohammed Thomas.

Prem Kumar: The host of the quiz show Who Will Win a Billion? (or W3B). Ram joins the show to take revenge. By the end of the book, he has helped Ram win the show and commits suicide in his car, though Ram suspects the show's producers had a hand in his death, since Ram wasn't supposed to win the quiz show.

Smita Shah: Ram's lawyer and childhood friend.  Though she is skeptical at first, she slowly comes to believe what he is telling her. Her real name is Gudiya, and she was the abused girl he mentioned in one of his stories — he promised to be like a brother to her and protect her so he pushed her drunkard father down the stairs.

Nita: A young prostitute with whom Ram falls in love.She bitterly tells Ram not to call her beautiful because that is the reason she was chosen instead of her plain-looking sister. Her brother is her pimp, so she implores Ram not to kill him. At the end of the book, she and Ram are married.

Shankar: When he was very young, he caught his mother and uncle in bed together and, as a result, his mother kicked him out. He still has the mind of a six-year-old boy and cries out coherently for his "Mummy" in his dreams when he is delirious from rabies. He has a blue notebook full of pictures that he has drawn for and of his mother.

Neelima Kumari: A famous actress who plays only female (tragic) lead roles and wants to stay "young" forever. Ram spent some time with her as a servant. She is based on Meena Kumari. Known as the "Tragedy Queen," she is abused by Prem Kumar but refuses to turn him in, saying that a true Tragedy Queen must possess real sadness in her life. She commits suicide, wanting to be remembered as the young and beautiful actress, but the police find her body a month later — after it has decomposed.

Chapters 
Each chapter of the novel is named after the prize money he receives when he answers each game show question right.

Prologue - The novel opens with Ram Mohammed Thomas being kidnapped by the police at night. This is a normal occurrence for slum dwellers, apparently, and he has been terrified of it for years because, over the course of his life, he has taken lives and committed crimes in order to survive. The police torture him, and question him about the quiz show he starred in, 'Who Wants To Win a Billion'? Ram won the quiz show before the producers had enough money to actually award a first-prize winner; the police are trying to get Ram to admit that he cheated in order to say that he does not deserve the prize.

1,000 The Death of a Hero - Ram is at the theater with his friend Salim, watching an action movie whose hero is Armaan Ali. Salim idolizes Armaan Ali and refuses to believe any bad rumors about him. Halfway through the movie, a man enters the theater and tries to touch his crotch; when Salim runs after him, he pulls off the man's fake beard to realize that it is the movie star, Armaan Ali in disguise. This is how Ram knew the first question.

2,000 The Burden of a Priest - This chapter covers the early years of Ram's life. It is explained that Ram was abandoned at an orphanage shortly after his birth. Due to his dark complexion, he was not popular among parents looking to adopt children from the orphanage. Ram was abandoned shortly after finally being adopted after his foster parents divorce. Subsequently, he is taken in by Father Timothy, who gave him a Christian last name, a Muslim middle name, and a Hindu first name, both because the religion of Ram's birth parents was unknown, and also to protect him from the communal riots raging in India. There he learned to speak English. Ram also learned everything about the Catholic church, which is how he knew the answer to the second question. This chapter also explains how Ram uncovered the dirty secrets of father John. Father John was discovered as gay.

5,000 A Brother's Promise - In this chapter, a family run by a husband who has lost his job moves into the chawl where Ram and Salim are staying. The father beats and sexually harasses his daughter Gudiya. During the chapter, the daughter gets sent to the hospital and Ram promised her that he would look after her cat Pluto (who is killed by the father). At the end of the chapter, Ram thinks that he kills her father when he pushes the older man off of the highest floor of their building. He flees to avoid persecution. This is how he knows the third question (which is about the smallest planet in the solar system: Pluto).

10,000 A Thought for the Crippled - This is where Ram is explaining his life to his lawyer, Smita, who has come to his rescue. In this chapter, Ram is a juvenile in an orphanage where he was taken after the death of father Timothy. He meets a lot of boys like him with many different backgrounds. Later in this chapter, he and his newfound friend Salim are chosen by Sethji, a man known to change young peoples lives. In Mumbai, Ram discovers what Sethji's real plan is and also learns about how he maims helpless children in order to make money. It is also in this chapter where Ram is given a lucky coin. Ram and Salim run away from the orphanage and move to Mumbai.

50,000 How to Speak Australian - In this chapter,  Ram works for the Taylors, a rich, self-absorbed family that has a habit of speaking badly of anyone and everyone. It seems that everyone who has worked for the Taylors is caught in their wrongdoing and Mr. Colonel Taylor catches them in the act. One day, Ram picks up the phone to hear Mr. Colonel speak in code to a man panting on the other line. Ram notices that the Taylors take their rich lifestyle for granted. One day, Ram follows Mr. Taylor to find him talking to a strange Indian man. The next day, a new cook arrives to replace the last one who thought he was in love with the Colonel's daughter. This new cook attempts a heist in the house when the Taylors were on vacation, but abandons his efforts when he realizes the Taylors do not store any valuables in their house, particularly in Mr. Colonel's heavily fortified den. Mr. Colonel shows he trusts Ram out of all his servants in his house by giving him access to his den to deactivate the security alarm. Mr. Colonel is arrested for treason and being a double agent.

100,000 Hold on to your Buttons - This chapter is about when Ram is living in Dharavi, Mumbai, working as a barman at Jimmy's Bar. Ram learns how to up his tips by taking advantage of peoples drunkenness by getting them to buy more. However, through this learning experience, Ram meets some unusual characters; one in particular named Prakash Rao, who tells him all about his Haitian wife and his brother who died of a heart attack. The poor man is in despair as he pours out his story to Ram that he stole money from his brother, and his wife, who is a voodoo priestess, makes a voodoo doll of his brother for him. Prakash Rao admits to Ram that he had the guilty pleasure of taking all his troubles out on the voodoo doll of his brother, giving him painful headaches and small heartattacks. Prakash Rao soon found out that his brother died a week ago of a major heart attack that he had caused through the voodoo doll. This is how Ram knows the answer to the fourth question.

200,000 Murder on the Western Express -  Ram has to travel to Mumbai to see Salim after working for the Taylors. He travels with his 50,000 rupees he had earned from working. He meets a family, tells their son about the money, then a robber comes in and the son, being jealous of Ram's money, rats him out. Then Ram ends up killing one of the robbers by shooting him in order to protect the beautiful daughter of the family, but the other robber vanished with his money. This is how he knows the answer to the fifth question.

500,000 A Soldier's Tale - Ram is living in a bunker: there is a war starting between India and Pakistan. An old servant tells heroic war stories about himself that inspire everyone. When the army comes to speak to the people in the bunker, it turns out that the storyteller is a liar. It leads Ram to the answer at the sixth question: which distinction you get if you did great deeds in war. The Param Vir Chakra.

1,000,000 Licence to Kill - In this chapter, Licence to Kill, Ram talks about meeting his best friend Salim after five years. First he didn't really want to see him. But then, when they both sat down on a bench watching little kids playing football, they realized how much they missed each other and started talking about the time when they didn't see each other. Salim talked about his past in which very much happened. He followed his dream to become an artist. He asked Mukesh Rawal if he could get a part in a film and he replied that he had to take some professional pictures and show them to him. Then he would become a junior artist. Junior artists play in the film a role for a few seconds and are only on the screen for about three seconds. But that's a good beginning for him. When Salim has taken these pictures, he got caught by a mob. The mob was going to burn him on a bus on which he was travelling. But fortunately, there was a man named Ahmed who threatened the criminals with a gun. Thus they could escape and Ahmed took Salim to his home. From now on, Salim cleaned the house of Ahmed and looked after it, when Ahmed wasn't at home. Ahmed was a man who bet on Indian cricket games and always won. After a while, Salim noticed that strange things were happening, such as Ahmed receiving yellow letters which contained information about a person, and then a few weeks later it would be announced on the criminal news that this person had been murdered. Salim found out that Ahmed was the man who killed these persons and once he saw that Ahmed had to kill Abbas Rizvi, who was a producer who had made a promise to Salim that he would make a star out of him. So Salim changed the photo for a photo of Mr Babu Pillai, alias Maman. Maman was the man who almost blinded the two boys. Then Salim got out of the house and didn't come back. A few months later, Salim heard that Ahmed was killed by the police in a shootout.

Then, there is the change to the studio, where Prem Kumar asked the last question: “How many test centuries has India’s greatest batsman Sachin Malvankar scored?” Ram's choices were a) 34, b) 35, c) 36 or d) 37. He answered c) 36 and won a million rupees.

10,000,000 Tragedy Queen - Ram lives as a servant in the house of Neelima Kumari, once a famous actress. The time Ram lives at her place, he discovers the sad and lonely life of an actress's faded glory. She was beaten and hurt by an unknown man. Neelima commits suicide in order to remain beautiful forever, but her body isn't found until weeks later when it is ugly and decomposed. After all this, Ram could answer the question about Neelima Kumari in the quiz show.

100,000,000 A Love Story - Ram ends up in a place near the Taj Mahal. He starts earning money by illegally guiding tourists. He finds shelter in a bunker nearby and he befriends a boy that cannot speak properly. Then, he meets a group of rich boys when acting as a fake guide, who take him to an expensive restaurant and to the Red Light District of Mumbai. He has sex with a young prostitute, Nita, and falls in love with her. She also loves him, but can't leave the brothel because of her brother who forces her to prostitute. Nita's brother tells Ram he needs 400,000 rupees to buy Nita her freedom. He steals the money from the woman where he is living but gives it to a man who begs him to give the money to him in order that he may then buy medicines for his son who is suffering from rabies in a mad dog. At the question in the quiz show, Ram calls this man because he is a teacher. He doesn't know the answer, but Ram nevertheless answers it right. It is, "In which of the plays of Shakespeare is one of the characters named ‘Costard’?" The answer is Love´s Labours Lost.

1,000,000,000 The Thirteenth Question - The last question has arrived, but Ram doesn’t know the answer. In the break, Ram wants to shoot Prem Kumar, the quizmaster, because it turns out that Prem was also the unknown man who hurt Neelima. As well as this, Prem is also the man severely abused Nita and put her in the hospital. Ram forces Prem to give the right answer but he only gives him a hint. He answers the last question correctly and wins the show.

Epilogue - Ram finished his story, which he was telling to his lawyer, Smita. Smita tells him that she is not named Smita. She is Gudiya, the daughter of Mr. Shantaram, whom Ram thought he had killed – but in reality, Mr. Shantaram had only broken his leg and completely reformed himself. Now she knows Ram did not cheat, and she helps free him.

See also
Charles Ingram

References

External links

Slumdog "Millionaire riveting despite changes: Swarup" - Times of India
"Slumdog has my stamp of approval says Vikas" - Times of India
"The Hole in the Wall Project" - Dr Sugata Mitra

Indian novels adapted into films
2005 Indian novels
Novels about orphans
Novels set in India
Doubleday (publisher) books
2005 debut novels